Year 528 (DXXVIII) was a leap year starting on Saturday (link will display the full calendar) of the Julian calendar. At the time, it was known as the Year of the Consulship of Sabbatius without colleague (or, less frequently, year 1281 Ab urbe condita). The denomination 528 for this year has been used since the early medieval period, when the Anno Domini calendar era became the prevalent method in Europe for naming years.

Events 
 By place 

 Byzantine Empire 
 February 13 – Emperor Justinian I appoints a commission (including the jurist Tribonian) to codify all laws of the Roman Empire that are still in force from Hadrian to the current date; this becomes the Corpus Juris Civilis.
 November 29 – Natural disaster: A second great earthquake strikes Antioch, killing thousands (including Patriarch Euphrasius), and causing a fire that destroys the Domus Aurea (Great Church) built by Constantine the Great.
 Justin, Byzantine general (magister militum), dies in battle against the Bulgars on the frontier of the Danubian limes in Moesia. He is succeeded by Constantiolus.

 Asia 
 March 31 – Emperor Xiaoming of Northern Wei, emperor of Northern Wei, is poisoned by order of his mother, the regent Empress Dowager Hu.
 April 1 – The 6-week-old only daughter of Emperor Xiaoming of Northern Wei is proclaimed empress regnant of Northern Wei, by Empress Dowager Hu.
 April 2 – Xiaoming's daughter is replaced by the 2- or 3-year-old Yuan Zhao as emperor of Northern Wei, by order of Empress Dowager Hu
 May 17 – Empress Dowager Hu, regent of Northern Wei, having resorted to an old monarchist tool and executed lovers who have displeased her, is drowned in the Yellow River along with the nominal emperor, the baby Yuan Zhao, and prince Yuan Yong by order of General Erzhu Rong, who places 21-year-old Yuan Ziyou on the throne as Emperor Xiaozhuang of Northern Wei.
 The Hephthalites (White Huns) move from the Hindu Kush into the Punjab region, and eastward across the Ganges Delta, ravaging cities and Buddhist monasteries.
 Yasodharman, Maharaja ("great king") of Malwa, defeats the Hun invaders under Mihirakula in central India.

 By topic 

 Religion 
 King Seong of Baekje adopts Buddhism as the state religion.
 Bulguksa, a Buddhist temple, is built in South Korea.

Births 
February 12 – Daughter of Emperor Xiaoming of Northern Wei, nominal empress regnant of Northern Wei

Deaths 
 March 31 – Emperor Xiaoming of Northern Wei, emperor of Northern Wei (b. 510)
 May 17
 Empress Dowager Hu of Northern Wei
 Yuan Yong, imperial prince of Northern Wei
 Yuan Zhao, emperor of Northern Wei (b. 526)
 Anicia Juliana, daughter of Olybrius (approximate date)
 Bodhidharma, Buddhist monk (approximate date)
 Euphrasius, patriarch of Antioch (in the earthquake) 
 Jabalah IV ibn al-Harith, king of the Ghassanids
 Justin, Byzantine general (magister militum)
 Procopius of Gaza, Christian sophist and rhetorician

References